Feng County, or Fengxian, is under the administration of Xuzhou, Jiangsu province, China. The northwesternmost and westernmost county-level division in the province, it borders the provinces of Shandong to the north and west, and Anhui to the south. The county is well known for its approximately 11,120 acres (or 450,000 ares) of Fuji apple trees.

Etymology 
The word "Feng" here has dual meanings: For one thing, it was the name of an ancient tributary of the Si River which flowed through the area. For another the area was deemed to be bountiful, while "feng" is also an adjective to describe such a condition in Chinese.

History 
Feng County proper was administered as a town under Pei county called Feng yi by the early Han dynasty before its establishment. Then it was assigned to then Pei Commandery, Yu province until 583, being a part of Pengcheng Commandery (later Xuzhou). It was once disestablished, but was restored in 457. The county was temporarily under the jurisdiction of Shandong province during 1949–53.

Video of chained mother of eight 

In January 2022, a Chinese blogger published video footage of a mother-of-eight, chained by the neck in a freezing shed in Feng County. According to a government statement released on 23 February, she originated from Yunnan, had been brought by a trafficker to Jiangsu in 1998 where she was sold twice as a bride, and had given birth to eight children between 1999 and 2020. The statement also said that her real name was Xiaohuamei. Her name had previously been reported as Yang Qingxia. The footage sparked outrage on the Chinese Internet and also garnered international attention. Initial attempts by local Xuzhou and Feng County authorities to quell the anger through statements proved to backfire for their clumsiness, for being contradictory, and for not addressing a number of questions arising from the footage. Some observers believed that the wider problem of trafficking women in this area had been enabled by the connivance of local officials. County-level militia was deployed to seal off the home village of Xiaohuamei, and more than 100 people were questioned by police over the public leaking of information related to her case. Xiaohuamei's husband, surnamed Dong, was officially arrested on 22 February on charges of abuse and suspicion of purchasing an abducted woman. Several high-ranking officials were punished and the Communist Party chief of Feng County was removed from his post.

Administrative divisions
At present, Feng County has 14 towns.
14 towns

Climate

References

External links
www.xzqh.org 

 
County-level divisions of Jiangsu
Administrative divisions of Xuzhou